Seyyed Beyglu (also Romanized as Seyyed Beyglū; also known as Seyyed Beglū) is a village in Arshaq-e Markazi Rural District, Arshaq District, Meshgin Shahr County, Ardabil Province, Iran. At the 2006 census, its population was 122, in 28 families.

References 

Towns and villages in Meshgin Shahr County